Kalateh-ye Dallakan (also Romanized as Kalāteh-ye Dallākān; also known as Dāllākān, Dalākān, and Dallākān) is a village in Sedeh Rural District, Sedeh District, Qaen County, South Khorasan Province, Iran. At the 2006 census, its population was 86, in 24 families.

References 

Populated places in Qaen County